Asha Jaoar Majhe is a 2014 Indian film by Aditya Vikram Sengupta. The film stars Ritwick Chakraborty and Basabdatta Chatterjee as an unnamed married couple, where it brings focus to the hard lives endured by ordinary working people in Kolkata.

The film premiered at the 11th Venice Days at the Venice International Film Festival on 4 September 2014 At the 62nd National Film Awards, it won the Indira Gandhi Award for Best Debut Film of a Director and Best Audiography.

Plot
The woman (Basabdatta Chatterjee) works in a handbag factory while the man (Ritwick Chakraborty) works the night shift at a printing press. The film follows that young married couple as they go about their day, how they stay apart all day long except one brief moment when they get to be with each other.  The entire movie has no dialogues. It has background music and some classic old songs thrown in for a soothing effect.

Cast
 Ritwick Chakraborty as the Man
 Basabdatta Chatterjee as the Woman

Awards

62nd National Film Awards (India)
 Indira Gandhi Award for Best Debut Film
 Best Audiography

New York Indian Film Festival
 Best Film
 Best Director
 Best Original Screenplay

 World Premiere at the 11th Venice Days Film Festival
 Best Debut Film

Marrakech International Film Festival
 Best Director

Abu Dhabi Film Festival
 Jury Special Mention

BFI London Film Festival
 Honorable Mention

Bangalore International Film Festival
 NETPAC Award for Best Asian Film

Jaipur International Film Festival
 Best Feature Film

References

External links
 

Bengali-language Indian films
2010s Bengali-language films
2014 films
Films scored by Alokananda Dasgupta
Films set in Kolkata
Films set in West Bengal
Films without speech
Best Debut Feature Film of a Director National Film Award winners
Films that won the Best Audiography National Film Award
2014 directorial debut films